Downfield is a residential area located in the north of Dundee, Scotland, centred on the stretch of the Strathmartine Road between the Kingsway and the northern boundary of Dundee. The area is bordered by St Marys and Ardler to the west, Kirkton to the east and Fairmuir to the south.

Downfield is sometimes considered to be part of the neighbouring areas, although Downfield is retained in the name of the local parish "Downfield South", and by the bus route which services the area. It also had a local railway station, Baldovan railway station, later known as Baldovan and Downfield railway station, on the former Dundee and Newtyle Railway.

Education
There are two primary schools in the Kirkton/Downfield area. Downfield Primary and Sidlaw View. Also Baldragon Academy along with Kingspark Special School for children with learning difficulties. Though these are sometimes considered to be in the Kirkton area. A number of new schools have recently been built in and around the area as part of the Dundee Schools PPP project.

Transport services 
Downfield is in the North Terminus for 22 Bus Service Downfield to City Centre.

Historically, Downfield had a railway station and tram links.

References 

Areas of Dundee